Philip M. Keegan (April 20, 1942 – February 23, 1998) is an American Democratic Party politician who served as a New Jersey Assemblyman and as the New Jersey Democratic State Chairman.

Keegan was a political prodigy, serving as national executive director of the Young Democrats.  In 1971, at age 29, he was elected to the Essex County Board of Freeholders.

He was elected to the State Assembly in 1973, representing the 28th district that included South Orange, Irvington and parts of Newark. He won the Democratic primary without opposition, and defeated Republicans Joseph T. DeVizio and Charles C. Deubal, Jr. by a margin of more than 2–1.  Keegan was the top vote getter in that race, edging out his running mate, Rocco Neri, by 439 votes.  He did not seek re-election to a second term in 1975.  Instead, he spent nearly 20 years building his engineering firm, PMK, and working as a public relations executive for Bally's Casino in Atlantic City.

Governor James Florio called Keegan back into service in 1990 to serve as New Jersey's Democratic State Chairman.

References 

1942 births
1998 deaths
County commissioners in New Jersey
Democratic Party members of the New Jersey General Assembly
Politicians from Essex County, New Jersey
20th-century American politicians